Maraú is a municipality in the state of Bahia in the North-East region of Brazil.
. The municipality is located in a peninsula called "Península de Maraú", physiographic area called "Região Cacaueira" (cocoa region). The city is rich in minerals, especially oil shale gypsum and oil.

History

The town originally called "Mayrahú" was an Indian village called "Mayra". No one knows about the disappearance of the Indian tribe, nor to which branch it belonged. The area was discovered in 1705 by Italian Capuchin friars who named it "São Sebastião de Mayrahú" (St. Sebastian of Mayrahú). In 1938 it became a city. Maraú has beautiful beaches of rare beauty and clear water surrounds most of its villages. It also has dozens of islands, waterfalls, mangroves ... Its best-known villages are: Barra Grande, Saquaíra, Taipus de Fora and Algodões

Geography

The municipality contains 49.32% of the  Baía de Camamu Environmental Protection Area, created in 2002.

Beaches

 Algodões;
 Arandí;
 Barra;
 Cassange;
 Mangueira;
 Piracanga;
 Saquaíra;
 Três Coqueiros;
 Taipús de Fora;
 Campinho.

Transportation

The Municipality is served by Barra Grande Airport, located in the district of Barra Grande.

See also

List of municipalities in Bahia

References

Populated coastal places in Bahia
Municipalities in Bahia